An election to Cambridgeshire County Council took place on 2 May 2013 as part of the 2013 United Kingdom local elections. 69 councillors were elected from 60 electoral divisions, which returned either one or two county councillors each by first-past-the-post voting for a four-year term of office. The electoral divisions were the same as those used at the previous election in 2009. No elections were held in Peterborough, which is a unitary authority outside the area covered by the County Council. The election saw the Conservative Party lose overall control of the council.

All locally registered electors (British, Irish, Commonwealth and European Union citizens) who were aged 18 or over on Thursday 2 May 2013 were entitled to vote in the local elections. Those who were temporarily away from their ordinary address (for example, away working, on holiday, in student accommodation or in hospital) were also entitled to vote in the local elections, although those who had moved abroad and registered as overseas electors cannot vote in the local elections. It is possible to register to vote at more than one address (such as a university student who had a term-time address and lives at home during holidays) at the discretion of the local Electoral Register Office, but it remains an offence to vote more than once in the same local government election.

Previous composition

2009 election

Composition of council seats before election

Changes between elections

In between the 2009 election and the 2013 election, the following council seats changed hands:

Summary
In total 292 candidates stood in the election. Only the Labour Party and the Conservative Party contested all 69 seats on the council. The Liberal Democrats stood 61 candidates, not standing in four divisions in Fenland and only contesting one seat in some two-member divisions. The United Kingdom Independence Party stood 52 candidates, including a full slate in Huntingdonshire, although two nominated candidates in Fenland withdrew before the deadline and did not appear on the ballot. The Green Party stood 25 candidates, mostly in Cambridge and South Cambridgeshire. The English Democrats stood two candidates in Whittlesey, while the Trade Unionist and Socialist Coalition stood two candidates in the Godmanchester & Huntingdon East division. The Official Monster Raving Loony Party stood two candidates in St Ives and in Bar Hill divisions, and one candidate stood for the Cambridge Socialists in Romsey. There were also nine independent candidates.

The United Kingdom Independence Party made substantial gains, taking 11 seats from the Conservatives mostly in Fenland and northern Huntingdonshire. Southern Huntingdonshire saw the Conservatives lose a seat to the Liberal Democrats in the Godmanchester & Huntingdon East division, as well as two seats to independents in the St Neots Eaton Socon & Eynesbury division. The Labour Party gained seats in Cambridge from the Liberal Democrats and the Green Party, including Arbury which Labour had won in a 2011 by-election, winning half of the city's 14 county council divisions. In East Cambridgeshire, the Conservatives gained both divisions in Ely from the Liberal Democrats but lost Littleport to UKIP. In South Cambridgeshire, Conservative council leader Nick Clarke lost his seat in Fulbourn to the Liberal Democrats. The Liberal Democrats however lost four other seats in the district including in Linton, where the Conservative candidate won by a single vote.

Aftermath
The Conservatives will continue to run the council however they will do so in a minority, with Whittlesey councillor Martin Curtis as council leader. In addition the council structure will switch from a cabinet system to a committee system, starting from May 2014.

Results summary

|}

Election of Group Leaders

Martin Curtis (Whittlesey North) was elected leader of the Conservative Group, Maurice Leeke (Waterbeach) challenged the incumbent Kilian Bourke (Romsey) for the leadership of the Liberal Democratic Group and won, and Paul Sales (Arbury) was elected leader of the Labour Group. In mid 2015 deputy Lib Dem leader Lucy Nethsingha (Newnham) was elected leader and deputy leader Ashley Walsh (Petersfield) replaced Sales as Labour leader.

In December 2013 Peter Reeve (Ramsey) stood down as UKIP group leader to be replaced by Paul Bullen (St Ives) with Simon Bywater(Sawtry and Ellington) as his deputy.

Election of Leader of the Council

Martin Curtis the leader of the conservative group was duly elected leader of the council and formed a conservative administration.

After less than a year as leader Curtis resigned and was succeeded by Steve Count (March North)

Results by District

Cambridge (14 seats)

District Summary

Division Results

East Cambridgeshire (9 seats)

District Summary

Division Results

Fenland (11 seats)

District Summary

Division Results

Huntingdonshire (19 seats)

District Summary

Division Results

South Cambridgeshire (16 seats)

District Summary

Division Results

References

Cambridgeshire County Council elections
2013 English local elections
2010s in Cambridgeshire